The 2000 European Canoe Slalom Championships took place in Mezzana, Italy between June 24 and 25, 2000 under the auspices of the European Canoe Association (ECA). It was the 3rd edition. The competitors took part in 8 events, but medals were awarded for only 7 of them. The C2 team event only had 3 teams participating. An event must have at least 5 nations taking part in order to count as a medal event.

Medal summary

Men's results

Canoe

Kayak

Women's results

Kayak

Medal table

References

 Official results
 European Canoe Association

European Canoe Slalom Championships
European Canoe Slalom Championships
European Canoe Slalom Championships
Sport in Trentino
Canoeing and kayaking competitions in Italy